Xyris stricta, the pineland yelloweyed grass, is a North American species of flowering plants in the yellow-eyed-grass family. It grows on the coastal plain of the southern United States from the Carolinas to Texas.

Xyris stricta is a perennial herb with a stem up to 100 cm (40 inches) tall with long, narrow leaves up to 60 cm (5 feet) long but generally less than 10 mm (0.4 inches) wide.

References

External links
Photo of herbarium specimen at Missouri Botanical Garden, collected in Florida in 1981

stricta
Plants described in 1860
Flora of the Southeastern United States
Taxa named by Alvan Wentworth Chapman